Leonid Cherevko (born 21 April 1974) is a Belarusian discus thrower. His personal best throw is 65.56 metres, achieved in 2000.

He won a silver medal at the 2001 Summer Universiade in Beijing, finished eighth at the 2002 European Championships in Munich and twelfth at the 2003 World Championships in Paris. He also competed in the 2000 and 2004 Olympics, but failed to qualify from his pool.

Achievements

External links

sports-reference

1974 births
Living people
Belarusian male discus throwers
Athletes (track and field) at the 2000 Summer Olympics
Athletes (track and field) at the 2004 Summer Olympics
Olympic athletes of Belarus
Universiade medalists in athletics (track and field)
Universiade silver medalists for Belarus
Medalists at the 2001 Summer Universiade